Shalini (born 20 November 1979), also known as Baby Shalini, is a former Indian child artist and actress who predominantly worked in Malayalam and Tamil films. During the 80s, Shalini was the most successful child artist in the Malayalam film industry. After taking a brief hiatus from child acting, Shalini made a come back in 1997 through Malayalam and Tamil Language films as a lead heroine. She married popular Tamil actor Ajith Kumar, on April 24, 2000 and retired from films after her marriage.

Early life
Shalini was born in a Protestant Malayali Christian family to Babu and Alice on 20 November 1979. Her father is from Kollam. Her father migrated to Madras with an ambition of becoming an actor and the family settled there. Later, he fulfilled his ambition through his children. Shalini attended Fatima Matriculation Higher Secondary School (K.G to 8th), Adarsh Vidyalaya, Chennai (9th to 10th) and Church Park, Chennai (11th and 12th). She completed college at Annamalai University. She is the middle child. Her younger sister Shamili and her elder brother Richard are also actors in the film industry. Shalini has stated that she enjoys badminton and has played in a few state-level tournaments.

Career
Shalini started her career as a child artist in Ente Mamattikkuttiyammakku and she acted in all the films under the direction of Fazil. She also played the lead character in the TV serial Amloo telecast in the late 1980s on Doordarshan. Her iconic hairstyle, a short bob with a front fringe, was popularly known as the “Baby Shalini hair cut”. 

Shalini soon went to study, and she returned to acting with Aniyathipravu, which was a blockbuster. In her next film Kaliyoonjal (1997), she co-starred with Mammootty and Dileep and it released to mixed reviews. After the success of the Malayalam Aniyathipravu, Fazil remade it in Tamil as Kadhalukku Mariyadhai (1997). Initially, Fazil was keen on casting a débutante in the lead female role, but Shalini insisted that she should also star in the Tamil version.  Like the Malayalam version, Kadhalukku Mariyadhai was also a blockbuster, and Shalini’s performance was also praised with Indolink.com recommending the film and citing that "Shalini returns in this film with a good performance". 

For the movie Amarkalam (1999), Saran initially approached Shalini, who was studying at the time and she refused, however, after a three-month pursuit, he finally got her to sign on as well. She was offered a role in Padayappa, which she rejected. The success of the film Kadhalukku Mariyadhai prompted Fazil to make another film with the lead pair, Vijay and Shalini, in 2000: Kannukkul Nilavu. Under Mani Ratnam’s direction, Shalini acted inAlaipayuthey (2000). She subsequently won the Tamil Nadu State Film Award Special Prize for her role in the film. In 2001, her last film  Piriyadha Varam Vendum was released, a remake of the Malayalam movie Niram, also starring Shalini.

Personal life
In 1999, during the shoot of Saran's Amarkalam, Shalini began to date her co-star Ajith Kumar. He proposed to Shalini in June 1999 (before their movie release in Aug. 1999) and, following consultations of both sides of the families, she accepted. They got married on 24 April 2000 at Chennai. After their marriage, Shalini retired as an actress following the completion of two unfinished projects. The couple have two children.

Filmography

As a child artist

As a leading actress

Awards
Kerala State Film Award for Best Child Artist -  Ente Mamattukkuttiyammakku (1983)
Tamil Nadu State Film Award Special Prize for Best Actress -  Alaipayuthey (2000)

References

People from Thiruvalla
Actresses in Tamil cinema
Tamil Nadu State Film Awards winners
Kerala State Film Award winners
Indian Christians
Indian film actresses
Actresses from Kerala
Living people
Actresses in Malayalam cinema
Actresses in Telugu cinema
1979 births
Indian child actresses
Child actresses in Malayalam cinema
20th-century Indian actresses
21st-century Indian actresses
Women artists from Kerala
Child actresses in Tamil cinema
Child actresses in Telugu cinema
Child actresses in Kannada cinema
Child actresses in Hindi cinema